Robert Bowes (died 2 April 1803) was the President of the Royal College of Surgeons in Ireland (RCSI) in 1787. He was Surgeon to the Charitable Infirmary, Inns Quay, Dublin, and also Surgeon to Simpson's Hospital.  He was a member of the Dublin Society of Surgeons, who petitioned the King in 1781 for the foundation of the Royal College of Surgeons.

Life
Cameron says of him that Bowes was a member of an aristocratic family, well known in Ireland in the last century, but who later disappeared from it. He commenced practice in Capel-street, Dublin, in 1761. About 1770 he migrated to No. 49 Jervis-street, which at the time was a fashionable medical quarter. For many years he was Surgeon to the Charitable Infirmary, Inns-quay. He was also Surgeon to Simpson's Hospital.

Bowes was a member of the Dublin Society of Surgeons whose goal was to create a separate organisation focused on providing standardised surgical education. The Society lobbied for a Royal Charter, in 1781 presenting the Lord Lieutenant a petition to be incorporated separately from the barbers. The awaited charter, incorporating the Royal College of Surgeons in Ireland,  was granted by King George III on 11 February 1784.

Bowes died a widower and childless. He bequeathed a considerable fortune to his relatives and friends, and made a bequest of £360 to the rector and churchwardens of St. Mary's parish for apprentice fees for the children of the parochial school.

References 

Presidents of the Royal College of Surgeons in Ireland
1803 deaths
Irish surgeons
Year of birth unknown